Kalat or Qalat is a district in Balochistan, Pakistan. The population of the district is estimated to be over 400,000 in 2005. The district is governed from the city of Kalat.

Kalat was notified as a district on February 3, 1954. At that time Khuzdar and Mastung districts were sub-divisions of Kalat (which then also included Kachi, Jhal Magsi and Naseerabad (Dera Murad Jamali); these were separated in 1965 as Kachhi District). Khuzdar became a separate district by notification of 1 March 1974, while Mastung was announced to be separate district on 18 February 1992. The district draws its name from the ancient city of Kalat. The old name of the district headquarters was Kahan. The current district consists of two sub-divisions, i.e. Kalat and Manguchar, four tehsils: Kalat Mangochar, Johan, and Gazgz, 81 Patwar circles and 614 mauza (villages).

The climate is arid, hot in summer and cold in winter, with most rainfall occurring in the winter. The terrain is mountainous with several valleys and one main river, mount Harboi in Kalat is known for Juniper old trees, the Moro River. The main economic activities are agriculture and livestock farming. The current Khan of Kalat is a ceremonial title held by Mir Suleman Dawood Jan, and efforts have been made by the Pakistani government to reconcile with him, his son Prince Mohammed, who is next in line to be the Khan of Kalat is pro-Pakistan.

Administration 
The district is administratively subdivided into the following tehsils:

 Kalat
 Mangocher

Demographics 
At the time of the 2017 census the district had a population of 211,201, of which 109,379 were males and 101,821 females. Rural population was 174,405 (82.58%) while the urban population was 36,796 (17.42%). The literacy rate was 39.14% - the male literacy rate was 48.09% while the female literacy rate was 29.45%. Islam was the predominant religion with 99.40% while Hindus were 0.59% of the population.

At the time of the 2017 census, 73.41% of the population spoke Brahui, 22.97% Balochi and 1.64% Pashto as their first language.

Education 
According to the Pakistan District Education Rankings 2017, district Kalat is ranked at number 66 out of the 141 ranked districts in Pakistan on the education score index. This index considers learning, gender parity and retention in the district.

Literacy rate in 2014–15 of population 10 years and older in the district stood at 54% whereas for females it was only 45%.

Post primary access is a major issue in the district with 83% schools being at primary level. Compare this with high schools which constitute only 9% of government schools in the district. This is also reflected in the enrolment figures for 2016–17 with 20,031 students enrolled in class 1 to 5 and only 658 students enrolled in class 9 and 10.

Gender disparity is another issue in the district. Only 34% schools in the district are girls’ schools. Access to education for girls is a major issue in the district and is also reflected in the low literacy rates for females.

Moreover, the schools in the district lack basic facilities. According to Alif Ailaan Pakistan District Education Rankings 2017, the district is ranked at number 128 out of the 155 districts of Pakistan for primary school infrastructure. At the middle school level, it is ranked at number 136 out of the 155 districts. These rankings take into account the basic facilities available in schools including drinking water, working toilet, availability of electricity, existence of a boundary wall and general building condition. 4 out of 5 schools do not have electricity in them. Approximately 1 out 2 schools lack toilet and a boundary wall. More than 1 out of 3 schools do not have clean drinking water.

See also 
 Kalat (princely state)

External links

 Kalat District at www.balochistan.gov.pk
 District Kalat at www.balochistanpolice.gov.pk

References 

 
Districts of Balochistan, Pakistan